Kim Lennhammer (born July 31, 1990) is a professional ice hockey defenseman who currently plays for Djurgårdens IF in the Elitserien.

Career statistics

References

External links

1990 births
Living people
Swedish ice hockey defencemen
Almtuna IS players
Djurgårdens IF Hockey players
Ice hockey people from Stockholm